WIFA (1240 AM, "Faith 1240 AM") is a radio station broadcasting a Contemporary Christian music format. Licensed to serve Knoxville, Tennessee, United States, the station serves the Knoxville area. The station is currently owned by Progressive Media, Inc. and features programming from Salem Radio Network.

References

External links

Progressive Media

IFA
IFA